Caliper Cove is a rounded, ice-filled cove in Lady Newnes Bay, situated between the mouths of Wylde Glacier and Suter Glacier along the coast of Victoria Land. The shape of the cove and the points that encompass it are nearly symmetrical suggesting calipers; hence the name applied by the New Zealand Antarctic Place-Names Committee in 1966.

References

 

Coves of Antarctica
Landforms of Victoria Land
Borchgrevink Coast